The flag of the Republic of Dar el-Kuti is the flag used by the Islamic separatists in the Republic of Dar el-Kuti and was created by Popular Front for the Rebirth of Central African Republic leader Noureddine Adam.

Design 
The flag shows three horizontal stripes in yellow (for the gold of the North), black (that the north was abandoned by the government in Bangui) and green (for the fertility of the land). In the centre of the black strip is a black star. It stands for the struggle of the people in the north for their self-determination.

References 

Republic of Logone
Logone